Mirosław Rybaczewski (born 8 July 1952) is a Polish former volleyball player, a member of the Poland national team from 1973 to 1980. During his career, he won the titles of the 1976 Olympic Champion and the 1974 World Champion.

Personal life
His daughter, Anna was also a volleyball player.

Honours

Clubs
 CEV Cup 
  1977/1978 – with AZS Olsztyn
 National championships
 1972/1973  Polish Championship, with AZS Olsztyn
 1975/1976  Polish Championship, with AZS Olsztyn
 1977/1978  Polish Championship, with AZS Olsztyn
 1981/1982  Polish Cup, with AZS Olsztyn

Youth national team
 1971  CEV U20 European Championship

References

External links

 
 
 Player profile at Volleybox.net

1952 births
Living people
Volleyball players from Warsaw
Polish men's volleyball players
Olympic volleyball players of Poland
Olympic medalists in volleyball
Olympic gold medalists for Poland
Volleyball players at the 1976 Summer Olympics
Medalists at the 1976 Summer Olympics
Polish expatriate sportspeople in France
Expatriate volleyball players in France
AZS Olsztyn players
Legia Warsaw (volleyball) coaches